For the reservoirs near Glossop, in Derbyshire, see Upper Swineshaw Reservoir and Swineshaw Reservoir (Derbyshire) 

Higher Swineshaw Reservoir is the highest reservoir in a series of four in the Brushes valley above Stalybridge in Greater Manchester. It was built in the 19th century to provide a supply of safe drinking water.  Though the reservoir and its watershed are totally in Greater Manchester it is within a mile of the Derbyshire border. It is owned and operated by United Utilities.

The reservoir dam consists of a clay core within an earth embankment. The Peak District Boundary Walk runs across the dam on the south side of the reservoir.

Capacity

See also 
 Walkerwood Reservoir
 Brushes Reservoir
 Lower Swineshaw Reservoir

References 

Reservoirs in Greater Manchester